Zangelan-e Olya (also Romanized as Zangelān-e ‘Olyā; also known as Zangelān-e Bālā) is a village in Hajjilar-e Jonubi Rural District, Hajjilar District, Chaypareh County, West Azerbaijan Province, Iran. At the 2006 census, its population was 326, in 89 families.

References 

Populated places in Chaypareh County